Our Meal for Tomorrow (Bokura no Gohan wa Ashita de Matteru/僕らのごはんは明日で待ってる) is a 2017 Japanese romance film, directed by Masahide Ichii and based on the novel by Maiko Seo.

Production 
Filming was entirely shot in Japan, running time was 109 minutes.

Plot 
Ryota Hayama is a sensitive loner, disliked by his schoolmates, and always downcast and unhappy. He is called Jesus by schoolmates because of his perpetual sad look. Koharu Uemura takes a liking to him, and they start a relationship. The relationship continues until unexpectedly, Koharu breaks up with him, telling him that her grandmother dissaproved of their relationship. Hayama is devastated, however he is approached by Emiri who is in love with him, and they start going out. Hayama however, realised that he is still in love with Koharu, and splits up with his new girlfriend, telling Hayama that he still loves her. He approaches Uemura to try to rekindle their relationship, however is once again rebuffed. He then finds out that all is not what it seems.

Cast
Yuto Nakajima as Ryota Hayama
Yuko Araki as Koharu Uemura
Amane Okayama as Yusuke Tsukahara
Karen Miyama as Emiri Suzuhara
Chieko Matsubara as Meiko Uemura

References

Japanese romance films
2017 films
2010s Japanese films
2010s Japanese-language films